Prospero homeobox protein 2 is a protein that in humans is encoded by the PROX2 gene.

References

External links 
 

Transcription factors